Sowchea Bay Provincial Park is a provincial park in central British Columbia, Canada. It is on Stuart Lake, west of Prince George. It is a busy destination for boaters and anglers, with a single-lane concrete boat launch available with limited parking.

References

External links
Official site

Provincial parks of British Columbia
Omineca Country
Protected areas established in 1989
1989 establishments in British Columbia